Bouansa (can also be written as Buansa or Bwansa) is a small town in southeastern Republic of Congo with a population of 20,361.

References 

Bouenza Department
Populated places in the Republic of the Congo